= Dhiryo =

Bullfighting practice in Goa, India

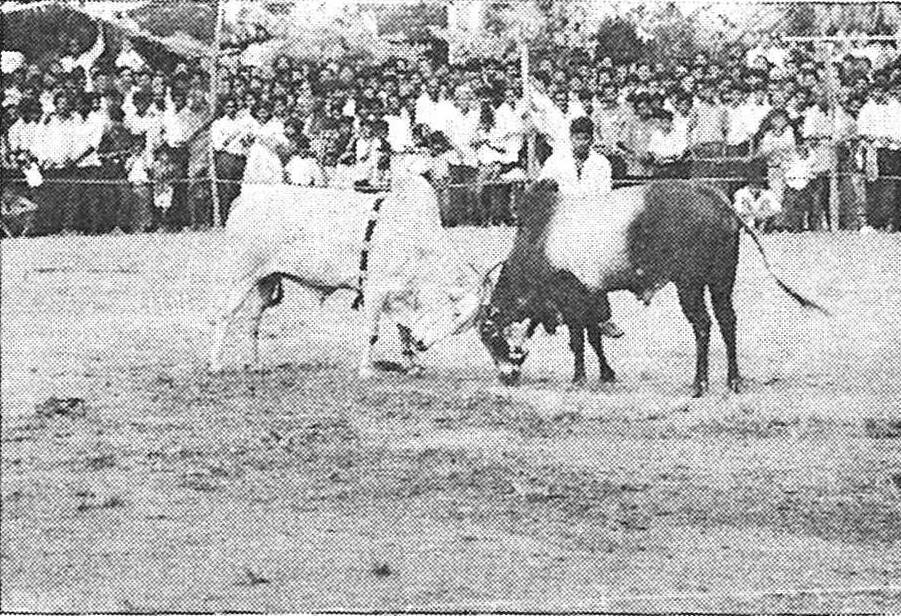
Dhiryo (bullfighting in Goa)

Dhiryo is an organized form of bullfighting practiced in Goa and various surrounding regions. The event consists of a staged fight between two bulls and is typically held as a featured attraction during local cultural festivals and feasts.

== Organization and event structure ==
Dhiryo matches are commonly held in open public spaces within villages, drawing large crowds of interested spectators. They are frequently organized to coincide with regional celebrations, particularly in South Goa. Winning animals are awarded designated prizes, and at certain venues, spectators must purchase entry tickets to view the event.

The bulls selected for competition undergo a systematic regimen of care. Owners and handlers provide specialized health management, distinct diets, and targeted training. While Dhiryo matches were traditionally managed by village-level groups or teams, modern iterations frequently involve individual owners independently rearing and entering their animals into the events.

== Match dynamics and rules ==
During a bout, the sponsors, owners, and supporters of the respective bulls actively cheer from the sidelines. They use verbal cues, physical gestures, and hand signs to stimulate their bull to attack the opponent and secure a win. If an animal attempts to withdraw or flees the arena before the physical confrontation begins, handlers intervene to bring it back to the field, utilizing a combination of coaxing methods or physical force.

A bull is declared victorious when it successfully drives its competitor completely outside the established boundaries of the arena ground. This displacement is generally accomplished using its horns or alternative physical maneuvers.

== Safety risks and animal welfare ==
Dhiryo events typically lack specialized protective barriers or formal safety infrastructure. Consequently, loose bulls occasionally push beyond the intended boundary lines of the arena, leading to recurring instances of severe injury or death among the gathering spectators. Furthermore, the participating bulls themselves regularly suffer physical injuries during the course of the combat.

== Comparison with European bullfighting ==
Dhiryo shares no close operational or historical relationship with European styles of bullfighting, displaying distinct differences in structure and outcome:

Feature	Dhiryo	European Bullfighting
Competitors	Pitted exclusively between two bulls	Involves direct combat between a human and a bull
Match Conclusion	Ends when one bull pushes the other out of the boundary lines	Typically culminates in the human killing the bull

== Controversy and legal petitions ==
Although Dhiryo and European bullfighting have historically maintained popularity in their respective regions as displays of bravery and skill, modern public sentiment has increasingly turned against such practices. Critics express disapproval of activities that subject animals to pain and distress solely for human amusement. Due to these growing concerns regarding animal welfare, legal applications have been submitted to the court seeking a formal prohibition of Dhiryo matches in Goa.
